Arthur Marsh may refer to:

 Arthur Marsh (politician), American politician from Michigan
 Arthur Marsh (footballer) (1947–2020), English footballer
 Arthur Hardwick Marsh (1842–1909), British painter and watercolourist